Oklahoma John also known as Ranch of the Ruthless or The Man from Oklahoma is a Spanish, German and 1965 Italian international co-production western film directed by Jaime Jesús Balcázar and Roberto Bianchi Montero.

Cast
Richard S. Hornbeck as Oklahoma Dan / John (as Rick Horn) 
Anton Geesink as Thomas Hunter
José Calvo	as Rod Edwards (as Joseph Calvo)
Sabine Bethmann as Georgina White
John McDouglas as Ken Hogg
Tom Felleghy as Watson (as Tom Felleghi)
Karl-Otto Alberty	as Hondo (as Charles Alberty)
George Herzig	as Jim Edwards (as George Herzig)
 Remo De Angelis as Michael
Antonio Almorós	as Cruck
 Carmen Gallen as Dueña del Saloon
 Giovanni Ivan Scratuglia as Randy
 Eduardo Lizarza as Criado

References

Bibliography
 Hardy, Phil, The Encyclopedia of Western Movies. Octopus, 1983.

External links
 

1965 films
Italian Western (genre) films
1960s Italian-language films
Spaghetti Western films
1965 Western (genre) films
Films directed by Roberto Bianchi Montero
Films scored by Francesco De Masi
West German films
German Western (genre) films
Spanish Western (genre) films
1960s Italian films
1960s German films